Simon Toyne (born 29 February 1968) is a British writer of thriller fiction, including the Sanctus Trilogy and Solomon Creed series.

Works

Sancti Trilogy 
 Sanctus (2011)
 The Key (2012)
 The Tower (2013)

Solomon Creed Series 
 The Searcher (2015)
 The Boy Who Saw (2017)
 Dark Objects (2022)
 Broken Promise (Solomon Creed #1.5) (2018)

References

External links
Author's website

British writers
Living people
1968 births